Wilhelm Hanstein  (3 August 1811 in Berlin – 14 October 1850 in Magdeburg) was a German chess player and writer.

Hanstein was one of the Berlin Pleiades. He helped found Berliner Schachzeitung, later to become Deutsche Schachzeitung. He was a civil servant.

In 1842, he won a match against Carl Jaenisch (+4 −1 =1). In 1847, he won a match against Karl Mayet (+12 −5 =1).

External links
 

1811 births
1850 deaths
German chess players
German chess writers
Sportspeople from Berlin
People from the Province of Brandenburg
German male non-fiction writers
19th-century chess players